Jose Aristimuño (born April 30, 1988) is a communications and marketing strategist, American television personality, and President and Founder of NOW Strategies LLC (DBA VIP MEDIA SOLUTIONS). Aristimuño is the former  Deputy National Press Secretary for The Democratic Party. Previously, he worked at the Department of Health and Human Services where he was the Director of Specialty Media. During the 2016 election cycle, Aristimuño was the Deputy National Press Secretary and Director of Hispanic Media for the former Governor of Maryland, Martin O'Malley. He is of Venezuelan descent. Aristimuño is a frequent media commentator for US & international media outlets and has been a keynote speaker at marketing & entrepreneurship conferences across the US & Latin America. He has also been included on Huffington Post's "40 Under 40: Latinos in American Politics"  Aristimuño lives in Boca Raton, Florida. He is married to Mariana Umaña.

References

American political consultants

American political activists 
American people of Venezuelan descent
American press secretaries